The Ein Ofarim killings was an attack by Palestinian Fedayeen, which occurred on Wednesday night, 12 September 1956.

The attack
On Wednesday night, 12 September 1956, a Palestinian Fedayeen squad infiltrated into Israel from Jordan. The militants attacked the Ein Ofarim oil-drilling camp near the village Hatzeva, while other personnel were out of the camp for grocery shopping. They killed 3 Druze watchmen, one in his room. The bodies of the guards were stabbed and their guns were stolen by the attackers.

Victims 
The three victims, Nawaf Abu-Ghazi (25 years), Suleiman Hatoum (25 years) and Rafik Abdullah (23 years), were burried in their hometown of Sumei. They were commemorated on Mount Herzl.

Aftermath 
With consulting his Cabinet, the Israeli Prime Minister decided on a reprisal raid. Since the nearest Jordanian police fort was 'topologically difficult', the police fort 80 kilometers away at Gharandal was chosen. During the operation, either 9 or 13 Jordanian police and members of a desert camel patrol unit were killed, along with two civilians. IDF casualties in the operation included one dead soldier and 12 wounded soldiers. The police station and nearby structures were destroyed.

References

Terrorist attacks against Israeli civilians before 1967
1956 murders in Israel
Terrorist attacks attributed to Palestinian militant groups
Terrorist incidents in Asia in 1956
Terrorist incidents in Israel in the 1950s
Terrorist incidents involving knife attacks
Stabbing attacks in Israel
Palestinian Fedayeen insurgency
History of the Druze
Druze community in Israel